Faisal Irfan (born 28 February 1979) is a Pakistani first-class cricketer who played for Quetta cricket team.

References

External links
 

1979 births
Living people
Pakistani cricketers
Quetta cricketers
Cricketers from Quetta